Carlos Alexandre Cardoso (born 11 September 1984), simply known as Cardoso, is a Brazilian former footballer who played as a central defender.

Born in Santa Rosa de Viterbo, São Paulo, Cardoso began his career at Comercial where he spent three years until joining Estrela Amadora. In 2008, during the winter transfer window, he moved abroad for the first time in his career to join Pandurii Târgu Jiu in Romania. Following a short stint at Russian club Alania Vladikavkaz in 2012, Cardoso returned to Brazil joining Esporte Clube Vitória. Cardoso joined Neftchi Baku in 2013 on a free transfer. In 2015, at the age of 30, Cardoso signed a one-year to play for Tractor Sazi of Tabriz in the Persian Gulf League.

Career

Neftchi Baku
Cardoso signed for Azerbaijan Premier League Champions Neftchi Baku in June 2013, making 68 appearances for them in all competitions before leaving in June 2015.

Tractor Sazi
On 13 July 2015 Cardoso signed a one–year contract with Persian Gulf Pro League club Tractor Sazi.

Career statistics

Honours
Vitória
Campeonato Baiano: 2013
Neftchi Baku
Azerbaijan Cup: 2013–14

References

External links

1984 births
Living people
Brazilian footballers
Association football defenders
Campeonato Brasileiro Série A players
Campeonato Brasileiro Série B players
Campeonato Brasileiro Série C players
Comercial Futebol Clube (Ribeirão Preto) players
Esporte Clube Vitória players
América Futebol Clube (MG) players
Primeira Liga players
C.F. Estrela da Amadora players
Liga I players
CS Pandurii Târgu Jiu players
FC Spartak Vladikavkaz players
Russian Premier League players
Azerbaijan Premier League players
Tractor S.C. players
Persian Gulf Pro League players
Brazilian expatriate footballers
Brazilian expatriate sportspeople in Portugal
Brazilian expatriate sportspeople in Romania
Brazilian expatriate sportspeople in Russia
Brazilian expatriate sportspeople in Azerbaijan
Brazilian expatriate sportspeople in Iran
Expatriate footballers in Portugal
Expatriate footballers in Romania
Expatriate footballers in Russia
Expatriate footballers in Azerbaijan
Expatriate footballers in Iran
Neftçi PFK players
People from Santa Rosa de Viterbo, São Paulo